The West Indies women's under-19 cricket team represents the countries of Cricket West Indies in international under-19 women's cricket.

The team played their first matches against the United States in August 2022 to prepare for the first ever international women's under-19 cricket competition, the 2023 ICC Under-19 Women's T20 World Cup. The side reached the Super Six stage of the inaugural tournament.

History
The inaugural Women's Under-19 World Cup was scheduled to take place in January 2021, but was postponed multiple times due to the COVID-19 pandemic. The tournament was eventually scheduled to take place in 2023, in South Africa. As a Full Member of the ICC, West Indies qualified automatically for the tournament.

The West Indies played their first series in August 2022, against the United States, losing the series 1–4. They announced their squad for the 2023 World Cup on 8 December 2022. The side reached the Super Six stage, in which they finished fifth in their group.

Recent call-ups
The table below lists all the players who have been selected in recent squads for West Indies under-19s. This includes their squads for their series against the United States, and for the 2023 ICC Under-19 Women's T20 World Cup.

Records & statistics
International match summary

As of 25 January 2023

Youth Women's Twenty20 record versus other nations

As of 25 January 2023

Under-19 World Cup record

References

Women's Under-19 cricket teams
C
West Indies in international cricket